A boathouse (or a boat house) is a building especially designed for the storage of boats, normally smaller craft for sports or leisure use. These are typically located on open water, such as on a river. Often the boats stored are rowing boats. Other boats such as punts or small motor boats may also be stored.

A boathouse may be the headquarters of a boat club or rowing club and used to store racing shells, in which case it may be known as a shell house.

Boat houses may also include a restaurant, bar, or other leisure facilities, perhaps for members of an associated club. They are also sometimes modified to include living quarters for people, or the whole structure may be used as temporary or permanent housing.	

In Scandinavia, the boathouse is known as a naust, a word deriving from Old Norse naverstað. These were typically built with stone walls and timber roofs and would be either open to the sea or provided with sturdy doors. The floors would be a simple continuation of the beach sand or rock, or they might be dug down to permit a boat to sail into the boathouse. The boathouse is also seen on riversides or lake sides.

Gallery

See also
Boatshed
 Houseboat, a boat used as a house.
 Stilt house
List of Charles River boathouses

References 

3. Drower, George, `A boat's abode: boathouses of the River Thames', House & Garden, March 1990, pp54-58

Boathouses